The following is a list of flags of Iran.

National flag

Governmental flags

Military and police flags

City flags

Organization flags

Historical flags

Political flags

See also 

 Flag of Iran
 Emblem of Iran
 Imperial Standards of Iran
 Lion and Sun

References

See also

 Flag of Iran
 Emblem of Iran

Lists and galleries of flags
Flags of Iran
Flags